Spring Oak Senior Living Community - Elks Home (formerly The Elks National Home) is a retirement home and national historic district located at Bedford, Virginia.

History 
The Elks National Home was built in 1916 by the Benevolent and Protective Order of Elks, who first started the home in 1903. The Elks National Home historic district includes twenty-three contributing buildings, three contributing sites, a contributing structure, and two contributing objects.

The Elks Home was featured briefly in the 1991 film What About Bob?, where it stands in as a mental institution.

Its  property was listed on the National Register of Historic Places in 2008.

In November 1923 the facility was the site of an accidental mass poisoning. Nine men were killed after drinking apple cider served in the dining room. A local farmer had produced the drink and stored it in a barrel that had been used to hold a pesticide.

In 2013, the Elks National Home property was sold to New River Assisted Living for $4.5 million. The name of the property was changed to English Meadows Elks Home.

Modern uses 
The Elks Home is popular locally for the large display of Christmas decorations it puts up each year. Visitors enter the driveway in their vehicles and slowly proceed through the displays, which line the driveway, free of charge.

Elks National Home and Retirement Center is the name of a nonprofit organization with 501(c)(3) status that formerly owned the Elks National Home property. The nonprofit organization has discontinued operations as of 2019, and its continuing source of revenue are the bequests of an ongoing trust, and the nonprofit organization intends to discontinue operations as soon as practical.

See also
Bedford Historic District (Bedford, Virginia)

References

External links

Elks National Home, 931 Ashland Avenue, Bedford, Bedford City, VA at the Historic American Buildings Survey (HABS)

Residential buildings on the National Register of Historic Places in Virginia
Historic districts on the National Register of Historic Places in Virginia
National Register of Historic Places in Bedford, Virginia
Colonial Revival architecture in Virginia
Residential buildings completed in 1916
Elks buildings
Clubhouses in Virginia
Retirement communities
Historic American Buildings Survey in Virginia
1916 establishments in Virginia